Prosopochaeta fidelis is a species of fly in the family Tachinidae.

Distribution
Peru.

References 

Endemic fauna of Peru
Diptera of South America
Dexiinae
Insects described in 1967